The NS GP33ECO is a 4-axle diesel-electric locomotive built by the Norfolk Southern Railway in its Juniata Locomotive Shop. The locomotive is a rebuild of the EMD GP50 designed to meet Tier 3 emissions standards. The first locomotive was completed in January 2015. The rebuild was funded in part by the federal Congestion Mitigation and Air Quality Improvement Program.

References

Further reading 
 

B-B locomotives
EPA Tier 3-compliant locomotives of the United States
Norfolk Southern Railway locomotives
Rebuilt locomotives
Standard gauge locomotives of the United States
Railway locomotives introduced in 2015